Philip Eden (born 13 December 1963) is a former professional rugby league footballer who played in the 1980s and 1990s.

Playing career

County Cup Final appearances
Phil Eden played  in Wakefield Trinity's 8–11 defeat by Castleford in the 1990 Yorkshire County Cup Final during the 1990–91 season at Elland Road, Leeds on Sunday 23 September 1990.

Club career
Phil Eden made his début for Wakefield Trinity during January 1983, and he played his last match for Wakefield Trinity during the 1993–94 season.

Genealogical information
Phil Eden is the father of the rugby league footballer; Greg Eden.

Conviction
Phil Eden was jailed for 16-months in November 2013 after pleading guilty to possessing images of child pornography.

References

External links
Phil Eden Memory Box Search at archive.castigersheritage.com

1963 births
Living people
Castleford Tigers players
English people convicted of child pornography offences
English rugby league players
Halifax R.L.F.C. players
Place of birth missing (living people)
Rugby league centres
Rugby league wingers
Wakefield Trinity players